The OMA SUD Redbird is an Italian two-seat, composite light-sport aircraft (LSA) from composite maker OMA Sud. Introduced at the AERO Friedrichshafen show in 2012, the aircraft is supplied complete and ready-to-fly.

Design and development
The Redbird is a carbon fiber, low-wing aircraft with side-by-side configuration seating and fixed tricycle landing gear powered by a  Rotax 912ULS or Rotax 912iS aircraft engine or a Fiat automotive diesel engine. The airframe was designed to accommodate retractable gear and the intention is that the European version will offer fixed or retractable gear, while the US LSA version will have fixed landing gear.

The aircraft first flew in early 2012, but by 2015 manufacturing arrangements had not been finalized and production not commenced.

Operational history
Reviewer Marino Boric described the design in a 2015 review as, "elegant and usually roomy" and added that it "belongs to the high end UL/LSA segment".

Specifications (Redbird)

References

External links

Light-sport aircraft